The men's points race competition at the 2022 UEC European Track Championships was held on 12 August 2022.

Results
200 laps (40 km) were raced with 20 sprints.

References

Men's points race
European Track Championships – Men's points race